Qareh Tappeh (also known as Karatapa, Qara Tepe, and Rah Tappeh) is a village in Harzandat-e Sharqi Rural District, in the Central District of Marand County, East Azerbaijan Province, Iran. At the 2006 census, its population was 121, in 42 families.

References 

Populated places in Marand County